Oboronia bueronica, the ginger blue, is a butterfly in the family Lycaenidae. It is found along the southern coast of Kenya and in north-eastern Tanzania, Malawi, Mozambique and Zimbabwe. The habitat consists of dense forests.

Both sexes are attracted to flowers.

The larvae feed on Costus species. They are associated with very small unidentified dark brown ants.

References

Butterflies described in 1895
Polyommatini
Butterflies of Africa